XEAD-FM is a radio station on 101.9 FM in Guadalajara. The station is owned by Notisistema and is known as La Buena Onda.

History
XEAD-FM received its first concession on October 11, 1967. It was owned by Radio Sinfonia, S.A., along with XEAD-AM 1150 (which remains co-owned).

The current concessionaire took control in 2000.

Booster
This repeater operates with 81 watts ERP.

References

Radio stations in Guadalajara
Radio stations established in 1967
Mexican radio stations with expired concessions